The Little Feller is a 1982 Australian film directed by Colin Eggleston.

Plot
A woman becomes obsessed with her best friend's husband and seeks to remove all obstacles between them, including his young son.

References

External links

The Little Feller at National Film and Sound Archive
The Little Feller at AustLit

1982 films
Australian drama television films
Films directed by Colin Eggleston
1980s English-language films
1980s Australian films